Three ships of the Royal Navy have borne the name HMS Anglesea. A fourth Royal Navy vessel carried the related name HMS Anglesey:

 , a 44-gun fourth rate launched in 1694 and the first naval vessel built at Plymouth Dockyard. She was sunk as a breakwater off Sheerness in 1742.
 , a 44-gun fifth rate launched in 1742, captured by France in 1745 and in French naval service as LAnglesea until 1753.
 , a 44-gun fifth rate launched in 1746 and sunk as a breakwater in 1764.
 , an offshore patrol vessel launched in 1978 and sold to the Bangladesh Navy in 2003.

See also
 Marquis of Anglesea (1815 ship), wrecked in 1829
 TSS Anglesey (1887), a steam turbine cargo vessel

References
 

Royal Navy ship names